Navalgund or Navalagunda  is a panchayat town in Dharwad district in the Indian state of Karnataka. Navalagunda or Navilagunda  means hill of peacocks. Navalgund is famous for Navalagunda durries. Navalagunda durries has been accorded Geographical Indication (GI) tag. Its GI tag number is 51.

Geography
It has an average elevation of 578 metres (1896 feet). It is situated 35 km from Hubli and is famous as the birth place of 'Jamkhanas', the floor covering woven using cotton ropes, a kind of flat & thin carpet. It is famous for the Holi festival. The world famous Ramling Kamanna and the famous Naglinga Swamy temple are in Navalgund, as well as the famous Nilamma Tank

Annigeri, Alagavadi, Morab and Shalavadi are the main villages.

Bennihalla is the main stream that flows through Navalgund.

A holy place near Navalagund is Yemanur.

Education 
Shri Shankar Arts, Commerce & Science College
 Shri Gurashantheshwar High School & P U College, Shalawadi

Demographics
 India census, Navalgund had a population of 22,200. Males constitute 51% of the population and females 49%. Navalgund has an average literacy rate of 59%, lower than the national average of 59.5%: male literacy is 68%, and female literacy is 50%. In Navalgund, 14% of the population is under 6 years of age.

Navalgund Religion Data 2011 
Population, 24,613

Hindu, 72.14%

Muslim, 26.51%

Christian, 0.16%

www.census2011.co.in

References

Cities and towns in Dharwad district